"Kung-Fu" is a song by English speed garage duo 187 Lockdown, released in 1998. The song was a top 10 hit, peaking at No. 9 on the UK Singles Chart. It also reached No. 1 on the UK Dance Singles Chart.

The song contains vocal samples from Street Fighter II, Mortal Kombat 2 and FX & Scratches Vol. 5 by Simon Harris.

Mixmag included "Kung-Fu" in their list of "The 15 Best Speed Garage Records Released in '97 and '98".

Track listing
UK CD single
 "Kung-Fu" (Radio Edit) (3:34)
 "Kung-Fu" (Ramsey and Fen Remix) (5:50)
 "Kung-Fu" (Prisoners of Technology/TMS 1 Remix One) (6:33)
 "Kung-Fu" (Original 187 Mix) (6:31)
 "Kung-Fu" (Prisoners of Technology/TMS 1 Remix Two) (6:33)
 "Kung-Fu" (187 Lockdown Instrumental) (6:27)

Charts

References

1998 songs
1998 singles
187 Lockdown songs
East West Records singles